Sascha Raabe (born 10 June 1968) is a German politician of the Social Democratic Party (SPD) who served as a member of the Bundestag from the state of Hesse from 2002 until 2021.

Political career 
Raabe became member of the Bundestag in the 2002 German federal election. Throughout his time in parliament, he served on the Committee on Economic Cooperation and Development. In 2009, he also joined the Subcommittee on the United Nations, International Organizations and Globalization. From 2014 until 2015, he was his parliamentary group's spokesperson on development policy.

In addition to his committee assignments, Raabe was part of the German Parliamentary Friendship Group for Relations with the States of Central America.

In June 2018, Raabe announced that he would not stand in the 2021 federal elections but instead resign from active politics by the end of the parliamentary term.

Other activities 
 German Institute for Development Evaluation (DEval), Member of the Advisory Board (since 2012)
 German Foundation for World Population (DSW), Member of the Parliamentary Advisory Board (–2021)
 German Development Service (DED), Member of the Supervisory Board (2009-2010)

References

External links 

  
 Bundestag biography 

1968 births
Living people
Members of the Bundestag for Hesse
Members of the Bundestag 2017–2021
Members of the Bundestag 2013–2017
Members of the Bundestag 2009–2013
Members of the Bundestag 2005–2009
Members of the Bundestag 2002–2005
Members of the Bundestag for the Social Democratic Party of Germany